Back to the Future is a 1989 video game released by LJN for the Nintendo Entertainment System. The game is loosely based on the 1985 film of the same name. A sequel, Back to the Future Part II & III, was released in 1990.

Gameplay
In the single mode game, the player controls Marty McFly through various stages set in 1955 in which he collects various clock icons in order to advance to the next level, and avoid the gradual vanishing of his future (indicated by a fading photograph at the bottom of the screen). If the photograph fades fully, Marty would lose a life as it would show him vanishing. Collecting 100 clocks restored the photograph to its full, unfaded status. Two power-ups can help improve Marty's control: bowling balls that can destroy enemies and a skateboard which can speed up gameplay. There are also three minigames at the end of each stage, featuring such scenarios as Marty repelling Biff Tannen's gang of bullies from a cafe, blocking all the kisses Lorraine sends Marty (in the shape of little hearts), and having to position his guitar properly to stay in tune at the dance in order for George and Lorraine to kiss. The gameplay on these stages is often compared to that of Paperboy.

In the final stage, Marty gets to control the DeLorean time machine on the street at night, dodging lightning bolts and obstacles while accelerating in such a way as to reach  precisely at the end of the stage, enabling the time machine to bring Marty home to 1985.

The game only contains two songs from the film. One is a sped up version of "The Power of Love" which plays throughout most of the game; the other is "Johnny B. Goode", which plays in the guitar level.

If Marty loses all his lives, the player is shown a game over screen reading, "Tough luck Marty! It looks like you are stuck here". The player is also presented with this message if Marty fails to get the DeLorean to 88 mph by the time he reached the wires, regardless of how many lives he has left.

Reception 
Bob Gale, screenwriter of the Back to the Future films, has called the NES game "one of the worst games ever", and even insisted in interviews that fans should not buy it. According to Gale, LJN refused his requests to give input while the game was being developed; once he was shown the game, he asked them to make changes, but was told it was too late in the process to change anything.

References

External links 

Back to the Future (franchise) video games
LJN games
Nintendo Entertainment System games
Nintendo Entertainment System-only games
North America-exclusive video games
Single-player video games
Video games set in 1955
Video games based on films
1989 video games
Video games developed in Australia
Video games set in California